Buntport Theater Company is a non-profit, professional theater group based in Denver, Colorado. Intent on creating innovative and affordable entertainment, the six members of the troupe write and produce all of their work. Each piece grows from a collaborative process, without specific directors or designers.

The Company also hosts a variety of visual and performing artists and has attracted talent from Philadelphia, New York City, Seattle, and Australia to perform for Denver audiences.

Ensemble
The six-person team consisting of Brian Colonna, Hannah Duggan, Erik Edborg, Erin Rollman, Samantha Schmitz, and Evan Weissman works in a non-hierarchical way in order to collaboratively create all productions. All six members collaborate as playwrights, actors, designers, directors, producers and technicians.

History
Members of the company began collaborating while attending Colorado College in Colorado Springs, in the late 1990s.

The company moved into a cement warehouse, next to a Greek wholesale food distributor at 717 Lipan St., Denver, Colorado in 2000 and renovated it into a fully functioning black box theater with modular seating. Before that, they had created a few productions together, touring them to theaters, schools, and fringe theatre festivals. As of 2022, Buntport has created 45 main-stage productions and 100 episodes of two "live sit-coms" (Magnets on the Fridge and Starship Troy). Their all-ages live comic book, tRUNks, has produced over 40 installments.
 
Buntport has been able to create their own niche in the local and national theater scene, fostering many audience members over a ranging spectrum of people. Buntport has garnered more than 75 awards, including Denver's Mayor Award in 2010 and many more nominations from newspapers, magazines, television stations and theater educators.

Process
Buntport Theater Company is known for their working collaboratively and non-hierarchically.

Main Stage Productions
Buntport Theater Company creates at least three full-length productions each year and every show is a world premiere original.

Past productions (chronological) 

 Quixote
 “...and this is my significant bother.” (based on the work of James Thurber)
 Word-Horde (an adaptation of sorts of Beowulf)
 Fin
 Ward #6 (Anton Chekhov)
 Donner: A Documentary
 Titus Andronicus! The Musical!
 The Odyssey: A Walking Tour
 The 30th of Baydak
 Elevator
 Cinderella
 Idiot Box
 McGuinn & Murry
 Kafka On Ice
 MacBlank (adaptation of MacBeth)
 Horror: The Transformation
 Realism: The Mythical Brontosaurus
 A Synopsis of Butchery
 Something is Rotten (adaptation of Hamlet)
 Winter in Graupel Bay
 Moby Dick Unread
 Vote For Uncle Marty
 Musketeer
 Anywhere But Rome (based on Ovid)
 Seal. Stamp. Send. Bang. (Musical)
 The Squabble 
 Indiana, Indiana
 The World Is Mine
 Jugged Rabbit Stew
 My Hideous Progeny
 Tommy Lee Jones Goes to Opera Alone
 The Roast Beef Situation

Special Productions
Part of the mission at Buntport is to offer as much high-quality programming as often as possible, while keeping ticket prices low, in order to keep audience members engaged. To involve people on a regular basis, Buntport created the live sit-com format. During six months of the year, they debuted a new episode of a “sit-com” every other Tuesday and Wednesday night, complete with commercial breaks and summer re-runs. The writing of each episode was inspired by an audience suggestion from the previous episode and often featured guest stars from the Denver theater scene. The first adventure into this field (titled Magnets on the Fridge) became a cult hit, winning numerous awards from the media and critics, and attracting a loyal following. Magnets on the Fridge ran for five seasons before being replaced by Starship Troy, which ran for three seasons. Buntport finished their live sitcom careers on December 31, 2008, with the 100th episode of their sitcoms.

tRUNks
Using the format of their live sit-com, a team of the Buntport ensemble's friends and peers creates and performs a family-friendly live comic book called tRUNks, every other Saturday. Produced by Buntport (and sometimes featuring the ensemble members as guest stars), tRUNks is written and performed by Jessica Robblee, Mitch Slevc and Matt Zambrano. They have won awards for great children's theater from every major paper in Colorado as well as from the Colorado Theatre Guild.

Ongoing Programs
Starting in 2009, Buntport is offering a rotation of three different events each month.

Teacher's Pet 
This unique “show and tell” night is co-sponsored by Found Magazine, Teacher’s Pet gives audience members the opportunity to sign up for a performance slot.  With five minutes per slot, performers share stories on the evening's topic.

Pecha Kucha Night Denver 
This presentation format was created in Japan as a way for designers to share their work without taking a painfully long time to do so. Presenters show 20 slides for 20 seconds at a time. After 6 minutes and 40 seconds, time is called. Now an international sensation, Pecha Kucha is a great way for the Arts community to share ideas, mingle and simply have a fun evening together. Winner of “Best PowerPoint Presentation for Hipsters” from Westword newspaper.

Buntport Versus 
This program has members of Buntport trying to beat other people at their own game. On any given evening, you may see Buntport try to out-dance a modern dance troupe, out-rap a hip-hop group, or even out-tease Burlesque performers. At Buntport Versus the audience watches a short movie documenting Buntport's foray into the given field, then meets both teams and learns about the competition genre, watches the battle, and votes who wins: the expert in the field or Buntport.

These three programs play four times a year, alternating on the third Tuesday of each month.

"Buntport vs" Debut
On March 17, 2009, alternative hip hop band Flobots appeared with the Buntport Theater troupe for the first "Buntport vs" event. The Flobots played "Stand Up", "Rise" and covered "Happy Together" by The Turtles. Denver Mayor John Hickenlooper attended the performance.

Community
In addition to their artistic offerings, Buntport Theater Company works hard to develop positive relationships with the community. They donate 100% of a night's ticket sales to a different local non-profit during the run of each main-stage production.

Awards
Buntport has won over 50 awards from the media and critics. Here is a sampling:

 The American Theatre Wing's 2011 National Theatre Company Grant
 Westword Reader's Choice 2008:
 “Best Theater Season”
 Moby Dick Unread “Best Theater Production”
 Outfront Magazine Marlowe Awards 2007:
 Moby Dick Unread “Best Production - Comedy”
 KMGH-TV A*List 2007:
 “Best Live Theater”
 Alliance For Colorado Theatre:
 “Theater Company of the Year”
 Denver Post 2007 Ovation Awards:
 tRUNks “Best Children's Show”
 5280 Magazine Reader's Choice 2007:
 “Top Dance/Arts/Theater Company”
 Colorado Theatre Guild Henry Awards:
 Something Is Rotten “Outstanding New Play”
 Westword Best of Denver 2007:
 “Best Theater Season”
 A Synopsis of Butchery “Best Original Play”
 A Synopsis of Butchery “Best Set - Small Theater”
 Denver Post 2006 Ovation Awards:
 “Best Year for a Company” Something Is Rotten “Best Comedy”
 Westword Mastermind Award 2005:
 “Innovation in the Performing Arts”
 Westword Best of Denver 2005:
 Kafka On Ice “Best Experimental Play”
 Rocky Mountain News Top Of The Rocky 2004:
 “Top Playwright”
 Denver Post 2003 Ovation Awards:
 Misc. “Best New Work”
 “Best Sound Design, The 30th of Baydak”
 Westword Reader's Choice 2003:
 “Best Season”
 Titus Adronicus! The Musical “Best Production”
 Rocky Mountain News Top Of The Rocky 2003: “Top Theater Company”

References

External links 
 

Theatre companies in Colorado
Performing groups established in the 1990s